The Olkaria IV Geothermal Power Station is an operational geothermal power plant in Kenya, with installed capacity of .

Location
The geographical coordinates of Olkaria IV Geothermal Power Station are 0°55'05.0"S,  36°20'04.0"E (Latitude:-0.918056; Longitude:36.334444).

Overview
The power station is one of six geothermal power plants currently either operational, under constriction or planned in the Olkaria area in Nakuru County, Kenya. Olkaria I, Olkaria II, Olkaria III and Olkaria IV are operational. Olkaria V is under construction and Olkaria VI is planned for 2021.

Olkaria IV Geothermal Power Station was commissioned by Uhuru Kenyatta, the president of Kenya, on 22 October 2014. The  power station cost KSh11.5 billion (US$126.5 million) to build, co-financed by the World Bank, the Kenya government and the European Investment Bank. The electromechanical parts were supplied by  Hyundai Engineering of South Korea, Toyota Tsusho of Japan, and KEC International of India.

A thousand Maasai people were relocated for the project in August 2014.

Ownership
Olkaria IV Power Station is owned by Kenya Electricity Generating Company (KenGen), whose stock is traded on the Nairobi Stock Exchange, and is 70 per cent owned by the government of Kenya with the remaining 30 percent owned by private institutions and individuals.

See also

 List of power stations in Kenya
 Geothermal power in Kenya
 Olkaria III Geothermal Power Station
 Olkaria V Geothermal Power Station

References

External links
Website of Kenya Electricity Generating Company 

2014 establishments in Kenya
Geothermal power stations in Kenya
Energy infrastructure completed in 2014
Nakuru County